Frederick George Banbury, 1st Baron Banbury of Southam  (2 December 1850 – 13 August 1936), known as Sir Frederick Banbury, 1st Baronet, from 1903 to 1924, was a British businessman and Conservative Member of Parliament.

Early life
Frederick Banbury was born on 2 December 1850. He was the eldest son of Frederick Banbury and Cecilia Laura (née Cox) of Shirley House Surrey., and was educated at Winchester College.

Business career
Banbury was admitted to the London Stock Exchange in 1872 and was head of Frederick Banbury and Sons, stockbrokers, of London, between 1879 and 1906, as well as chairman of the Great Northern Railway (GNR) and a director of the London and Provincial Bank.

Politics
Banbury was elected to represent Camberwell, Peckham in the House of Commons at the 1892 general election, and held the seat in 1895 and 1900. At the 1906 general election he lost the seat as the Liberal Party won a large majority. Later in the year he returned to parliament when he was returned unopposed in a by election for the City of London. He held the seat until 1924.

He was a diligent member of the Commons, and was known for his formal attire and punctuality. Although he remained on the back benches he was regarded as an institution in the House. Banbury was created a baronet, "of Southam in the County of Warwick", in 1903, and admitted to the Privy Council in 1916. When the bill which led to the initial extension of the franchise to women was passing through parliament, Banbury said during a debate:"Women are likely to be affected by gusts and waves of sentiment. Their emotional temperament makes them so liable to it. But those are not the people best fitted in this practical world either to sit in this House ... or to be entrusted with the immense power which this bill gives them."

After his retirement from the House of Commons in January 1924, he was raised to the peerage as Baron Banbury of Southam, of Southam in the County of Warwick.

Railways
He was the last chairman of the GNR, which lost its identity when, under the Railways Act 1921, it was grouped with several other railways on 1 January 1923 to become a constituent of the London and North Eastern Railway (LNER). Sir Frederick was a strong opponent of the railway grouping, and had voted against the Bill during its passage through Parliament; he wanted no part of the future LNER, and decided to retire from railway service at the end of 1922. In late September 1922, the GNR honoured Sir Frederick by naming its newest express passenger locomotive no. 1471 Sir Frederick Banbury. This locomotive belonged to GNR Class A1, was built in July 1922 and remained in service until November 1961.

Personal life
Banbury married Elizabeth Rosa, daughter of Thomas Barbot Beale, of Brettenham, Suffolk in 1873. She died in 1930. Banbury survived her by six years and died in August 1936 at his home, Warneford Place, Highworth, Wiltshire aged 85. He was buried in Sevenhampton. He was succeeded in the barony by his grandson Charles, his only son Captain Charles William Banbury having been killed in the First World War.

Banbury was an animal lover, and for years was on the council of the Royal Society for the Prevention of Cruelty to Animals, and served as its chairman.

Notes

References

Sources
Kidd, Charles, Williamson, David (editors). Debrett's Peerage and Baronetage (1990 edition). New York: St Martin's Press, 1990,

External links 

 

Banbury of Southam, Frederick Banbury, 1st Baron
Banbury of Southam, Frederick Banbury, 1st Baron
People educated at Winchester College
Banbury of Southam, Frederick Banbury, 1st Baron
Conservative Party (UK) MPs for English constituencies
UK MPs 1892–1895
UK MPs 1895–1900
UK MPs 1900–1906
UK MPs 1906–1910
UK MPs 1910
UK MPs 1910–1918
UK MPs 1918–1922
UK MPs 1922–1923
UK MPs 1923–1924
UK MPs who were granted peerages
Directors of the Great Northern Railway (Great Britain)
Members of Parliament of the United Kingdom for the City of London
Members of the Privy Council of the United Kingdom
Barons created by George V